The Songs of My Mother (Песни моей мамы) is a Russian album by the singer Vitas. It was released in the 3rd of April 2003. Together with the previous album Mama, the two albums were a tribute to his late mother. Songs from these albums featured heavily in the setlist of Vitas' extensive world tour The Songs of My Mother, performed at hundreds of venues in several countries from 2004-2006.

While Mama included several new songs written by Vitas, Songs of My Mother consists entirely of cover versions of popular older songs, described as "the gold reserves of Russian pop music", including the 1980 song, The Bird of Happiness, composed by Aleksandra Pakhmutova and Nikolai Dobronravov (from Yuri Ozerov's 1981 film O Sport, You - the world!), previously recorded by the vocal – instrumental ensemble Zdravstvuy, Pesnya, among others. The song The Bird of Happiness became from 1981 on forward the most successful in both Russia and China, and is still often performed by Vitas on stage. The song Chrysanthemums Have Faded was previously included on Vitas' Smile! album. All the other tracks were newly recorded for Songs of My Mother.

Vitas performed a piano-backed arrangement of Winter on a Russian New Year TV show in 2002.

Track listing

Personnel 

 Sergey Pudovkin – executive producer
 Mikhail Dobrotvorskiy – management
 Dmitriy Dobrotvorskiy – direction
 Eduard Izmestyev – production, arrangement
 Mikhail Grishin – engineering
 Ilya Grebenyuk – keyboards
 Aleksandr Gruzdev – guitar, saxophone
 Rashit Kiyamov – bass guitar
 Rushan Kharryasov – drums, percussion
 Oboz Design Studio – sleeve design

References

External links
 Official Site
 English translations of lyrics

Vitas albums
2003 albums